The 1899 Wimbledon Championships took place on the outdoor grass courts at the All England Lawn Tennis and Croquet Club in Wimbledon, London, United Kingdom. The tournament ran from 19 June until 27 June. It was the 23rd staging of the Wimbledon Championships, and the first Grand Slam tennis event of 1899.

Champions

Men's singles

 Reginald Doherty defeated  Arthur Gore, 1–6, 4–6, 6–3, 6–3, 6–3

Women's singles

 Blanche Hillyard defeated  Charlotte Cooper, 6–2, 6–3

Men's doubles

 Laurence Doherty /  Reginald Doherty defeated  Clarence Hobart /  Harold Nisbet, 7–5, 6–0, 6–2

References

External links
 Official Wimbledon Championships website

 
Wimbledon Championships
Wimbledon Championships
Wimbledon Championships
Wimbledon Championships